Mehli is a village in the Nawanshahr district of Punjab, India, that is located on the south-east edge of Phagwara city.
According to the Census figures in 2001, the total population of this village was 3227.

References

Nawanshahr
Villages in Shaheed Bhagat Singh Nagar district